The second season of The Bellflower Bunnies, a children's animated series based on the Beechwood Bunny Tales books by Geneviève Huriet and Loïc Jouannigot, aired on the French television network TF1 from 22 September 2004 to 23 February 2005. It was directed by Eric Berthier, produced by Patricia Robert and written by Valérie Baranski.

Production on this season, which comprised twenty-two episodes, lasted from July 2003 to October 2004.  While TF1 remained on board, a new roster of voice actors, crew and companies participated. Among them were Paul Cadieux, a staff member of Quebec's Megafun studio; Canadian talents Julie Burroughs, Hugolin Chevrette and Elisabeth Lenormand; and China's Hangzhou Flying Dragon Cartoon.

The episodes were originally broadcast on TF! Jeunesse, the children's service of TF1, every Wednesday morning. The sole exception was "Noël chez les Passiflore", a holiday episode which premiered on a Saturday. Until 2014, this season aired in continuous rotation on France's Disney Junior channel. It has also been seen on Canada's TFO, Germany's Kinderkanal (KI.KA), and the Middle East's Al Jazeera Children's Channel.

Production
Co-production partners for this season included France's TF1, Euro Visual, Big Cash, and that country's department of Walt Disney Television. In Canada, they consisted of animation studio Tooncan and production company Megafun, both located in Montreal, Quebec. Also joining the production was China's Hangzhou Flying Dragon Cartoon, which handled animation duties.

The French voice cast consisted of Flora Balzano (who played Mistletoe), Julie Burroughs, Hugolin Chevrette (who played Poppy), Mario Desmarais, Antoine Durand, Marylène Gargour, Annie Girard, Hélène Lasnier and Elisabeth Lenormand. The English dub starred Danielle Desormeaux, Anik Matern, Holly Gauthier-Frankel, Eleanor Noble, Matt Holland, Joanna Noyes, Liz Mac Rae, Simon Peacock and Laura Teasdale.

Eric Berthier, who has worked on several French television series, replaced Moran Caouissin as the director. Paul Cadieux, a Megafun staff member, served as executive co-producer; Yves Pont and Franck Algard, through their company Euro Visual, became executive producers. Alice Willis took over music scoring duties, and also played piano and keyboard.

Returning from the first season were screenwriter Valérie Baranski, story editor Fabrice Ziolkowski and producer Patricia Robert, along with Reanud Bouet in the backgrounds department, and Arnold Gransac on layouts. Loïc Jouannigot, the illustrator of the original books, was credited under "characters, location & props creation".

Awards and merchandise
The Bellflower Bunnies won three awards at the 6th Festival International du Film de TV de Luchon in 2005, one of which was the "Ecran Jeunesse" in the Animation category.

On 21 October 2005, Éditions Milan published Le grand livre animé de la famille Passiflore, a ten-page pop-up book featuring five scenes from the show.

Episodes
Each episode in this season runs 22 minutes in length. The first nine episodes are based on original Beechwood Bunny Tales, and the rest are written by Baranski. In the O and B columns, numbers to the right refer to their positions in this season.

DVD releases

Region 1
On 12 April 2005, the Direct Source company released four DVD titles, in association with Filmoption International: Tales, Adventures, Friends, and Holidays. Like their Season 1 predecessors, these volumes also consisted of two episodes each; this time, the original French audio is provided along with the English dub. On 21 February 2006, Tales and Adventures were reissued together, as were Friends and Holidays.

Region 2

France
From October 2004 to July 2005, TF1, Beez Entertainment and Seven Sept brought out five volumes of the show's second season. The first three consisted of four episodes each, and the last two consisted of five; all of them contained the original French episodes and their English counterparts. On 27 October 2005, all of these volumes, excluding the very first one from 2003, were packaged into a single box set, which was reissued on 11 October 2006, with a plush doll of Dandelion.

Germany
Episodes 5-8 in the official series order were released by edelkids on 22 February 2008, in time for Easter. This came about as a result of the show's success on local television. The series continued on 14 August 2008 with episodes 9-16. As with the first volume, colouring pages and edelkids previews were used as special features.

Hungary
On 13 June 2005, V.I.P Art Kft. of Budapest released six episodes of season 2 on three discs (under the franchise name Tappancs család):

See also
 List of The Bellflower Bunnies episodes

Notes

References
General

Specific

External links
 The Bellflower Bunnies at TF1.fr

Official sites for this season's DVD distributors:
Beez Entertainment / Seven Sept (France)
edelkids (Germany)

Bellflower Bunnies
Bellflower Bunnies
2004 French television seasons
2005 French television seasons